The following is a list of awards and nominations received by Northern Irish actor, model and musician Jamie Dornan. After playing minor roles in various films, Dornan had his first major role in BBC crime drama The Fall. There playing a serial killer, he won the Irish Film and Television Award and was nominated for a British Academy Television Award for Best Actor. His performance as czech soldier Jan Kubiš in Anthropoid (2016), garnered nominations for the  British Independent Film Award and Czech Lion Award for Best Supporting Actor.

His critically panned performance in Fifty Shades of Grey (2015) led him to winning two Golden Raspberry Awards. But he earned a People's Choice Award for his performance in Fifty Shades Freed (2018).

Dornan's portrayal of a working class father in Kenneth Branagh's semi-biographical drama film Belfast (2021), earned him nominations for the Golden Globe Award and Critics' Choice Movie Award for Best Supporting Actor.

He was honoured with the Oscar Wilde Award by the US-Ireland Alliance in 2021.

Major Accolades

British Academy Television Awards
The British Academy Television Awards, also known as the BAFTA Television Awards, are given by the British Academy of Film and Television Arts honouring the best in television.

Golden Globe Awards
The Golden Globe Awards is an annual award ceremony where members of the Hollywood Foreign Press Association celebrate excellence in both film and television industries.

Screen Actors Guild Awards
The Screen Actors Guild Awards presented annually by the SAG-AFTRA Foundation,  honour outstanding acting performances in film and television.

Critics awards

Other Accolades

AACTA Awards
The Australian Academy of Cinema and Television Arts Awards, known as the AACTA Awards (formerly Australian Film Institute Awards), are bestowed by the Australian Academy of Cinema and Television Arts to honour excellence in domestic and international film and television industries.

British Independent Film Awards
The British Independent Film Awards recognize achievements in independent films.

Czech Lion Awards
The Czech Lion Award is the highest honour in Czech Republic celebrating excellence in films.

C21 International Drama Award

CinEuphoria Awards

GQ Men of the Year Award
The award is presented by the GQ Magazine.

Irish Film and Television Awards
The Irish Film and Television Awards are given by the Irish Film and Television Academy. The Academy recognises achievements in both film and television industries.

Logie Awards
Established in 1959, the Logie Awards are presented by TV Week, celebrating excellence in Australian television. The Most Outstanding categories are jury voted.

MTV Movie Awards
MTV Movie Awards (now MTV Movie and TV Awards) are presented by MTV, where winners are decided by public voting.

National Film Awards UK
The National Film Awards UK is an annual award ceremony hosted by the National Film Academy to celebrate blockbuster and independent films.

People's Choice Awards
The People's Choice Awards is an American public voted award ceremony.

Satellite Awards
The Satellite Awards are given by the International Press Academy. Dornan has been nominated once.

TV Times Awards
The TV Times Awards are a set of public voted awards, given by the TV Times Magazine.

Film Festival Awards

Fashion Awards

The Fashion Awards
The Fashion Awards are organized by the British Fashion Council, with a view to recognizing outstanding contributions to fashion industry.

Models.com The Model of the Year Award
The Models.com annually organizes the Model of the Year Awards where fashion industry professionals vote for modelling talents.

Parody Award

Golden Raspberry Awards
The Golden Raspberry Awards are a set of parody awards.

Notes
Shared with Caitríona Balfe, Judi Dench, Jude Hill, Ciarán Hinds and Colin Morgan.
Shared with Dakota Johnson.

External links

References 

Dornan, Jamie